Larry Beinhart is an American author. He is best known as the author of the political and detective novel American Hero, which was adapted into the political-parody film Wag the Dog.

Biography 
An early inspiration was the works of George Bernard Shaw, who besides his writing skills and wit, "created dramas out of ideas". By this dictum, Beinhart seeks to "create situations in which ideas - about God, why we go to war, who gets the money, how politics work, what the media actually does, about science and morality - are challenged by circumstances". Recipient of a Raymond Chandler Fulbright Fellowship in Detective and Crime Fiction Writing, Beinhart spent two years at Wadham College in Oxford, England. His No One Rides for Free (1986) received a 1987 Edgar Award.

Beinhart has been a columnist for Al Jazeera since October 2016, at Alternet 2005-2012 and had a blog at The Huffington Post in 2011. His principal concerns are the US economy and politics, taxes and the rising inequalities moving into the age of Trump. Beinhart joined the Al Jazeera TV series Empire as a behind-the-scenes consultant for the 2013 episode "Empire of Secrets" about the clandestine world of government secrets.

Film adaptions 
 Wag the Dog (1997) was directed by Barry Levinson; it starred Dustin Hoffman, Robert De Niro, Anne Heche, William H. Macy, Denis Leary, Kirsten Dunst, Woody Harrelson, and Willie Nelson. The New Yorker called the novel "a tour de force of satirical fiction."

His novel Salvation Boulevard, was adapted as a film and released in 2011. It features Pierce Brosnan, Greg Kinnear, Jennifer Connelly, Marisa Tomei, Isabelle Fuhrman, Ed Harris, and Jim Gaffigan. The director is George Ratliff, the producers are Cathy Schulman and Celine Rattray.

Personal life 

Residing in Woodstock, New York with his wife and two children, Beinhart is a keen skier and sometime instructor at Hunter Mountain in New York State.

Selected works

Novels 
 No One Rides For Free (1986)*
 You Get What You Pay For (1988)*
 Foreign Exchange (1992)*
 American Hero (1993) (reissued as Wag the Dog: A Novel)
 The Librarian (2004)
 Salvation Boulevard (2008)
 The Tony Cassella Mysteries (omnibus) (2013)*
 The Deal Goes Down (2022)
* Tony Cassella series

Non fiction 
 How to Write a Mystery (1996)
 Fog Facts: Searching for Truth in the Land of Spin (2005) PublicAffairs,

References

External links 

  (archived 2012)

Larry Beinhart at Al Jazeera
Larry Beinhart's blog at The Huffington Post
Larry Beinhart: Federal Confidential at Buzzflash

Mandalay finds 'Salvation Boulevard' Ratliff to write, direct Beinhart adaptation By Michael Fleming, Variety, June 23, 2008.

Year of birth missing (living people)
Living people
20th-century American novelists
20th-century American male writers
American crime fiction writers
Edgar Award winners
21st-century American novelists
People from Woodstock, New York
American male novelists
21st-century American male writers